Calliotropis talismani is a species of sea snail, a marine gastropod mollusk in the family Eucyclidae.

Description
The height of the shell attains 7¾ mm.

Distribution
This species occurs in the Atlantic Ocean off Morocco and Western Africa at depths between 840 m and 1350 m.

References

  Locard A. (1898). Expéditions scientifiques du Travailleur et du Talisman pendant les années 1880, 1881, 1882 et 1883. Mollusques testacés. Paris, Masson.vol. 2 [1898], p. 1-515, pl. 1-18

External links
 To World Register of Marine Species

talismani
Gastropods described in 1898